Cat Thief (foaled January 30, 1996 in Kentucky) is an American Thoroughbred racehorse. He is the son of Storm Cat, an outstanding Champion sire and the grandson of both the 20th Century's most important sire, Northern Dancer and whose damsire was the U.S. Triple Crown champion, Secretariat. Cat Thief's dam was the multiple stakes winner, Train Robbery, a daughter of U.S. Racing Hall of Fame inductee Alydar.

Conditioned for racing by Hall of Fame trainer, D. Wayne Lukas, at age two Cat Thief won two of his seven starts including the Lane's End Breeders' Futurity. He was then third behind winner Answer Lively in the Breeders' Cup Juvenile. As a three-year-old, Cat Thief made thirteen starts. He ran third to winner Charismatic in the 1999 Kentucky Derby and seventh to Charismatic in the Preakness Stakes. Under jockey Pat Day, Cat Thief went on to win the Swaps Stakes and at Gulfstream Park in Florida Pat Day was aboard him again for the most important win of his career, the Breeders' Cup Classic.

Cat Thief made ten more starts in 2000 but did not earn a win and was retired to stud at his owner's Overbrook Farm for the 2001 season.

References
 Cat Thief's pedigree and partial racing stats
 Full pedigee information, racing details, and leading runners sired at the Thoroughbred Times Interactive Stallion Directory

1996 racehorse births
Racehorses bred in Kentucky
Racehorses trained in the United States
Breeders' Cup Classic winners
Thoroughbred family 13-b